Sarchu (also known as Sir Bhum Chun) is a major halt point with tented accommodation in the Himalayas on the Leh-Manali Highway, on the boundary between Himachal Pradesh and Ladakh in India.

 

The journey along the Manali-Leh highway normally takes two days, so travellers and tourists stop overnight here. An Indian army camp is sited nearby on the banks of the Tsarap Chu river. The highway and the camp are closed during the winter, when snow blocks the high passes along the road.

Main Attraction 
Earlier known for its significance as the old Silk Route. It is as yet a top most loved destination for traders of Himalayas, itinerant clans and adventure seekers.

Sarchu is of great importance mainly due to its location on the Leh-Manali highway. It also resembles Ladakh with its barren splendor. This place can be visited between June and September when the snow melts and the Leh-Manali highway is open for traffic. Sarchu is an important route for Ladakh Manali Highway. In other words, life line for both states.

Sarchu is the starting point for Zanskar Trek of Ladakh. The trek is very testing as it includes exploring through remote crevasses, crossing high passes and waterways. There are dazzling perspectives on the snow-loaded pinnacles at every step of the way of on this trek. Other than seeing the normal magnificence along the path, the trek has some hair-raising challenges like river crossing, steep edges, and navigating through restricted canyons. The desolate excellence of Sarchu allures the travellers who are searching for comfort in the midst of mountains.

Boundary dispute 
The boundary at Sarchu was disputed between the states of Himachal Pradesh and Jammu and Kashmir. There is a pillar on the boundary, and records state that the boundary follows a drainage divide, but operators of seasonal tent accommodations cross the border to get favorable sites.

In 2019, after this part of Jammu and Kashmir was reorganized into the union territory of Ladakh, there was renewed interest in having the Survey of India mark the border.

Weather 
During winters, the temperature may drop to -20°C or less depending upon the month while in summers the temperate varies from 5°C to 15°C during the day and may fall below 0°C at night. Staying in Sarchu has its own set of difficulties. AMS or Acute mountain sickness is among the fundamental difficulties. Travelers normally stop at Keylong or Jispa before heading out to Sarchu to acclimatize themselves. The chances of mountain sickness are uneven and depend on person to person and their present health conditions, although the possibility of getting hit by AMS cannot be ruled out completely.

References 

Inter-state disputes in India
Internal borders of India
Internal territorial disputes